The 2014 Division 1, part of the 2014 Swedish football season, was the 9th season of Sweden's third-tier football league in its current format. The 2014 fixtures were released in December 2013. The season started on 20 April 2014 and concluded on 2 November 2014.

Teams
A total of 28 teams contested the league, divided into two division, Norra and Södra. 20 returning from the 2012 season, two relegated from Superettan and six promoted from Division 2. The champion of each division qualified directly for promotion to Superettan, the two runners-up had to play a play-off against the thirteenth and fourteenth team from Superettan to decide who would play in Superettan 2015. The bottom three teams in each division qualified directly for relegation to Division 2. Due to four promoted teams from Division 2 being geographically located in Division 1 Södra, IF Sylvia were relocated from Division 1 Södra to Division 1 Norra.

Stadia and locations

Norra

Södra

 1 Correct as of end of 2013 season

League tables

Norra

Södra

Positions by round

Norra

Södra

Results

Norra

Södra

Season statistics

Norra top scorers

Södra top scorers

See also
 2014 Allsvenskan
 2014 Superettan
 2013–14 Svenska Cupen

References

Swedish Football Division 1 seasons
3
Sweden
Sweden